The Latin Recording Academy, formally known as the Latin Academy of Recording Arts & Sciences, is a multinational membership-based association composed of Latin music industry professionals, musicians, producers, recording engineers, and other creative and technical recording professionals. The Latin Academy of Recording is a group that places greater emphasis on aesthetic and technical accomplishments than it does on sales or chart positions. They want to provide a broader platform and raise the profile of Latino artist and creators, both domestically and internationally.

They are dedicated to promoting the genre and its makers, both inside and outside the United States. The Academy is internationally known for its annual Latin Grammy Awards. It is headquartered in Miami and is led by president and CEO Manuel Abud.

Historical highlights
 1997: The Recording Academy establishes the Latin Recording Academy as a Latin counterpart to expand its operation in Latin America and Spain.
 2002: Elected its first independent Board of Trustees. Manolo Diaz (Chairman); Gabriel Abaroa (Vice-Chair), Raul Vazquez (Treasurer) and Tom Gomes (Secretary).
 2004: Internationally renowned recording artist Carlos Santana was honored as the Latin Recording Academy Person of The Year. It honored his professional, cultural, and social  accomplishments.

Organization

The Latin Recording Academy draws its membership from music professionals from Spanish- and Portuguese-speaking communities worldwide, namely Latin America, Iberia, and the United States. Through its efforts, the Latin Academy works to strengthen these communities through networking opportunities and educational outreach. The Latin Grammy Awards were the first prime-time English-, Spanish-, and Portuguese-language telecast on U.S. television. Members of the Latin Recording Academy are also eligible to vote for the categories in the Latin field of the Grammy Awards.

The Latin Recording Academy has produced educational outreach programs in Buenos Aires, Los Angeles, Mexico City, Santo Domingo, San Juan, Bogotá, São Paulo and in the U.S. in Miami, Chicago, Los Angeles, Dallas, Houston, New York and San Antonio. The Latin Academy has also produced the e-Latin GRAMMY Carreras Y Música events. These events provide educational outreach to more than 10,000 high school age participants from at least 11 countries. The Latin Academy's programs provide interested students the opportunity, using interactive satellite technology, to discuss with musicians and members of the music industry what it is like to work in the business and what it takes to be successful in the field.

Latin Grammys

The Latin Recording Academy is best known for its role in putting on the annual Latin Grammy Awards. The Latin Grammy Awards typically takes place every November in Las Vegas, Nevada. The Latin Grammys have many awards to showcase artist that are involved in the music industry, some of the main awards that fans focus on are "Artist of the Year", "New Artist of the Year", "Song of the Year" and "Album of the Year".

The Latin Grammy Awards were originally broadcast by CBS and after 2005 they switched to Univision, the largest U.S. Hispanic Network. They have earned respect and they are already executing the steps towards the 13th Annual Latin Grammy Awards Ceremony.  The Latin Grammy Week includes the Special Awards Tribute (Lifetime Achievement Awards and the Trustees Awards), the Person of the Year Gala, the Pre-Telecast simulcast event, the Latin Grammy Telecast ceremony, the Official After Party and several other concerts aiming to promote the different genres of music.  The Latin Grammy Awards have taken place in New York, Los Angeles, Las Vegas, Houston and Miami. The Latin Grammy Week closes a cycle of music celebration formed basically by the Latin Grammy Street Parties (1.5 Million people have attended) and the Latin Grammy Intimate Concerts.

References

External links
 
 The Latin GRAMMY Award Winners searchable database
 2014 Latin GRAMMY® Award News By Medium.com

Companies based in Miami
Latin Grammy Awards
Music industry associations
Organizations established in 1997
Latin music
Music organizations based in the United States